The Sanctuary of Our Lady of Montallegro (Italian: Santuario di Nostra Signora di Montallegro) is a major Marian sanctuary in the Province of Genoa, located on a hill (approx 612 meters above sea level) inland in Rapallo. It was built - along with the annex shelter for pilgrims - in 1558  thanks to the funds of the inhabitants. The current marble facade was built in 1896 by the Milanese architect Luigi Rovelli and opened with a solemn ceremony on June 21 of that year.
Our Lady of Montallegro is the patroness of the city of Rapallo from 1739, when she was elected as the patron saint of the community rapallese, his Captaincy and the parishes of Santa Margherita Ligure. This recognition is reproduced on the municipal coat of arms showing from 28 November 1948 a letter "M" in the center of the two griffins below the royal crown.
The hymn of Our Lady of Montallegro, entitled shines on high, was composed and set to music by teacher and priest Giovanni Battista Campodonico.

The church
The interior of the sanctuary was renovated and enlarged in 1640 primarily, has a single nave with four side altars, in addition to another greater one where is kept and exposed to the veneration of the faithfuls a small Byzantine painting (which local legends say to be given by Maria herself as a gift to the inhabitants), placed permanently in 1743 in a Baroque Silver Pavilion donated by the noble Tomaso Noce.
In the first altar on the right side it is possible to admire Giovanni Battista Carlone's painting Visitazione; in the second altar hangs a crucifix made in white marble by Francesco Schiaffino. In the same altar on the left side is preserved as well Carlone school's painting Annunciazione.
The affrescature and pictorial decoration of the vault and apse were performed, respectively, by the painters Francesco Boero of Rapallo - with the representation, in four parts, of historical events and "miraculous" linked to the figure of the Byzantine icon - and the Genoese Nicolò Barabino that over the high altar (the work of nineteenth-century architect Luigi Rovelli) represented the scene of the Marian apparition to the farmer John Chichizola.
The organ of the church was built in 1907 by Inzoli of Crema.

References

Basilica churches in Liguria
Minor basilicas in Liguria
Roman Catholic churches in Genoa